Damage Kontrol is the third independent album by hip-hop artist Mr. Envi'. It was released on August 14, 2015 under Mia Mind Music/Southern Stisles Records and was distributed by Select-O-Hits. The album features guest appearances from Young Bleed, La Chat, Lady Cam and JTL. The album managed to reach the CMJ Hip Hop Top 40 National Airplay Chart, debuting at #40 its first week and moving up to #38 the second.

Track listing

References

External links 

2015 albums
Mr. Envi' albums